This is a list of museums in Guernsey, Channel Islands.

The list

Museums

Guernsey
Guernsey
Museums